Vertova (Bergamasque:  or ) is a comune (municipality) in the Province of Bergamo in the Italian region of Lombardy, located about  northeast of Milan and about  northeast of Bergamo.
 
Vertova borders the following municipalities: Casnigo, Colzate, Cornalba, Costa di Serina, Fiorano al Serio, Gazzaniga, Oneta.

Main sights
Parish church of Santa Maria Assunta
Church of San Lorenzo
Historical center
Capuchin Convent

References